Abdisho and Abda were two successive bishops of Kashkar who were martyred along with 38 companions in 376 during the Forty-Year Persecution in the Sasanian Empire.

Accused by his nephew of being a spy for the Roman Empire, Abdisho was arrested by the Sasanian authorities along with the priest Abd Alaha. They were tortured on the orders of Ardashir, viceroy of Adiabene, who then sent them on to Gondeshapur, where King Shapur II had them pressed between boards until their limbs were broken. According to the hagiography, they refused food that had been sacrificed to idols and were fed by a pious widow.

In Abdisho's absence, a new bishop was appointed, Abda, who was soon also accused of spying for Rome. He was arrested with 28 others and seven virgins and all were led in chains to Gondeshapur. According to the hagiography, they refused to worship the sun and each received one hundred lashes. Two Christian brothers, Barhadbshabba and Samuel, voluntarily joined them. All but the virgins were beheaded on 15 May 376. The next day, Abdisho and Abd Alaha were dealt the same fate. Roman slaves from a nearby village took the bodies. The virgins were executed on 22 May.

There may have been a political aspect to the persecution, since the king was attempting to establish Mazdaism as the state religion and judged Christians as the natural allies of the Romans. The historian Sozomen wrote about 22 martyrs who were tortured together. He mentions Abdas and Abdisho in 15th and 16th places in his list of martyrs. This information is worth trusting because it was written less than 100 years after their death.

Their feast day is 16 May in the Church of the East and according to the Martyrologium Romanum, the Eastern Orthodox Church, and  the Syriac Orthodox Church.

38 companions
The biographical text Ausgewählte Akten Persischer Märtyrer by Oskar Braun also mentions the names of several of the other martyrs, including:

Priests (16)
Abd Alaha
Simeon
Abraham
Aba
Ajabel
Joseph
Han
Ebedjesu
Abdallah
John
Ebedjesu
Maris
Berhadbesciaba
Rozichaeus
Abdallah
Ebedjesu

Deacons (9)
Eliab
Ebedjesu
Marjab
Maris
Abdias
Berhadbesciaba
Han
Simeon
Maris

Monks (6)
Papa
Evolesus
Ebedjesu and three others

Unnamed virgins (7).

References

Sources
Holweck, F. G. A Biographical Dictionary of the Saints. St. Louis, MO: B. Herder Book Co., 1924.
Fr. Joseph Irvin Vespers: Orthodox Service Books - Number 6. Lulu Press, Inc, 28 September 2017.
Fr. Joseph Irvin The Divine Liturgy of St. John Chrysostom: Orthodox Service Books - Number 1, Lulu Press, Inc, 8 July 2017.

Year of birth missing
376 deaths
4th-century Christian martyrs
4th-century bishops
Persian saints
People executed by the Sasanian Empire
Christians in the Sasanian Empire
Groups of Christian martyrs